Imperial was the name used for three separate makes of British car.

Imperial (Manchester) 1901-1906

Imperial Autocar Manufacturing company was based in Manchester, England. Two cars were introduced in 1901 with either a 3.5 hp  2 cylinder engine under the seat or 6 hp 2 cylinder engine front mounted.

Later the company sold French Lacoste et Battman models with Imperial bodies.  The last ones seem to have been sold around 1906.

Imperial (Croydon) 1904-1905
Another Imperial was made by the Anti-Vibrator company of Croydon, Surrey. These were electrically powered with a motor in each rear wheel. Unusually for the time, the car had integral construction of body and chassis.

Imperial (London) 1914
The Imperial cyclecar was made by Implitico, a theatre lighting company in London, for one year only immediately before the First World War. The power came from an 8 hp V-twin Precision engine with a "gearbox" giving seven forward speeds and optional reverse using belts and pulleys.

The Model A cost £110 and had reverse, the Model B at £95 did without.  About 12 cars were made.

See also
 List of car manufacturers of the United Kingdom

References

Cyclecars
Defunct motor vehicle manufacturers of England